Ana Carolina Vieira may refer to:

Ana Carolina Vieira (swimmer), Brazilian Olympics swimmer
Ana Carolina Vieira (fighter), Brazilian jiu-jitsu World champion